On January 7, 2005, President George W. Bush announced the establishment of the President's Advisory Panel on Federal Tax Reform, a bipartisan panel to advise on options to reform the United States income tax code to make it simpler, fairer, and more pro-growth to benefit all Americans.

Origins
The task force was created by the President's Executive Order 13369, amended by subsequent orders 13379 and 13386.

Report
On November 1, 2005, the Advisory Panel submitted to the Secretary of the Treasury a report containing revenue-neutral policy options for reforming the Federal Internal Revenue Code. The options are meant to:

 simplify Federal tax laws to reduce the costs and administrative burdens of compliance with such laws; 
 share the burdens and benefits of the Federal tax structure in an appropriately progressive manner while recognizing the importance of homeownership and charity in American society; and 
promote long-run economic growth and job creation, and better encourage work effort, saving, and investment, so as to strengthen the competitiveness of the United States in the global marketplace.

Members
Panel members included:
Connie Mack III, Chairman 
John Breaux, Vice-Chairman
William E. Frenzel 
Elizabeth Garrett
Edward P. Lazear 
Timothy J. Muris
James M. Poterba 
Charles O. Rossotti
Liz Ann Sonders

References 

Tax reform in the United States